The 467th Bombardment Squadron is an inactive United States Air Force unit.  Its last was assigned to the 333d Bombardment Group, stationed at Dalhart Army Air Field, Texas.  It was inactivated on 1 April 1944.

History
Established as a B-24 Liberator heavy bomb group in July 1942.  Assigned to Second Air Force as an operational training unit, providing replacement crew training for pilots and aircrews. Inactivated in 1944 with the phaseout of B-24 crew training.

Lineage
 Constituted 467th Bombardment Squadron (Heavy) on 9 July 1942
 Activated on 15 July 1942
 Inactivated on 1 April 1944

Assignments
 333d Bombardment Group, 15 July 1942 – 1 April 1944

Stations
 Salt Lake City Army Air Base, Utah, 15 July 1942
 Topeka Army Air Base, Kansas, c. 21 August 1942
 Dalhart Army Air Field, Texas, 22 February 1943 – 1 April 1944

Aircraft
 B-24 Liberator, 1942–1943

References

 

Military units and formations established in 1942
Bombardment squadrons of the United States Army Air Forces